The Molcha River forms a vast alluvial fan at the southern border of the Taklamakan Desert, as it leaves the Altyn-Tagh mountains and enters the desert in the western part of Qiemo County. The left side of the satellite photograph appears blue from water flowing in many streams. Around May, the river is filled with snow/glacier meltwater.

References
 

Rivers of Xinjiang